Kotoe Inoue (井上琴絵 Inoue Kotoe, born February 15, 1990) is a Japanese volleyball player who plays for the NEC Red Rockets.

Career
While attending high school, her volleyball team won in the Domestic Sports Festival.

Inoue won the Bronze medal and the Best Libero award at the 2010 Asian Club Championship.

Inoue won the 2017 World Grand Champions Cup Best Libero award.

Clubs 
 JT Marvelous (2008–2018)
 CSM București (2018–2019)
 Denso Airybees (2019–2021)
 NEC Red Rockets (2021–)

Awards

Individuals 
 2007 6th Asian Youth Volleyball Championship - Best Libero award
 2008 57th Kurowashiki All Japan Volleyball Tournament - New Face award
 2008 14th Asian Junior Volleyball Championship - Best Libero award
 2010 Asian Club Championship "Best Libero"'
 2011 2010-11 V.Premier League - Best Libero award
 2017 World Grand Champions Cup "Best Libero"

Clubs 
 2009-2010 V.Premier League -  Runner-Up, with JT Marvelous.
 2010 Kurowashiki All Japan Volleyball Tournament -  Runner-Up, with JT Marvelous.
 2010 Asian Club Championship - Bronze Medal with JT Marvelous.
 2010-11 V.Premier League -  Champion, with JT Marvelous.
 2011 60th Kurowashiki All Japan Volleyball Tournament -  Champion, with JT Marvelous.

National team

Senior team 
 2017 Asian Women's Volleyball Championship -  Champion

Junior team 
2007 Youth National Team -  Champion
2008 Junior National Team -  Champion

References

External links
 Profile - JVA Official Website

1990 births
Living people
Sportspeople from Kyoto
Japanese women's volleyball players
JT Marvelous players
Denso Airybees players
Expatriate volleyball players in Romania
Japanese expatriate sportspeople in Romania
Volleyball players at the 2018 Asian Games
Asian Games competitors for Japan